Ostia is a 1970 Italian drama film. It is the directorial debut of Sergio Citti.

Plot summary 
In the poor and infamous suburb of Ostia, two brothers live in a small run-down apartment. One day, they find a girl, who ran away from home to escape her father's sexual violences, and bond out of solidarity. When both brothers fall in love with her, they have several fights, at the end of which only one will survive.

Cast 

 Laurent Terzieff: Bandiera
 Franco Citti: Rabbino
 Anita Sanders: Monica
 Ninetto Davoli: Fiorino
 Lamberto Maggiorani: Monica' father
 Celestino Compagnoni: Bandiera and Rabbino's father

References

External links

1970 films
Italian drama films
Films directed by Sergio Citti
Films scored by Francesco De Masi
1970 drama films
1970s Italian films